Jacqueline Denise Welch (born 22 May 1958) is an English actress, television personality, writer and broadcaster. Her roles include Natalie Barnes in Coronation Street (1997–2000), Steph Haydock in Waterloo Road (2006–2010), and Trish Minniver in Hollyoaks (2021–2022). Welch also appears as a regular panellist on the ITV chat show Loose Women (2005–2013, 2018–present).

Welch's other acting roles include the television dramas Spender (1991–1993), Soldier Soldier (1993–1995), and Down to Earth (2004–2005). In 2011, she was a contestant on the sixth series of Dancing on Ice, where she was partnered with professional skater Matt Evers. In 2012, Welch won the ninth series of Celebrity Big Brother.

Early life
Jacqueline Denise Welch was born in Tynemouth, Northumberland on 22 May 1958. She has a younger sister, Debbie. Welch attended Bygate School in Whitley Bay, and La Sagesse School in Newcastle upon Tyne, before moving to Ebchester, County Durham at the age of 13, where she attended Blackfyne Grammar School in Consett and passed five GCE exams. She developed a penchant for acting at the age of 14 after being cast in a school production of Finian's Rainbow. At the age of 17, she contemplated going to a teacher training college in Crewe; however, her father and her drama teacher suggested she apply for the Mountview Academy of Theatre Arts in London. Welch was successful in her application, and graduated in 1979, gaining her Equity Card while teaching dance at the Watford Palace Theatre.

Career

Acting
Welch became an actress straight after leaving school, aged 12. She performed on stage in London in Yakkety-Yak with the McGann brothers at the Astoria Theatre in 1983, and later joined the Live Theatre Company, Newcastle, where she featured in many productions, including There's a Girl in My Soup, and an Alan Ayckbourn quartet of plays, including Bedroom Farce. She also played the role of Sandy in the musical Grease at the Haymarket Theatre, Leicester, in 1984.

Her first television appearance was in the Tyne Tees Television production Barriers in 1981. A few years later, she appeared in ITV's hit drama Auf Wiedersehen, Pet (1986), following this with roles in the children's television show Byker Grove (1990–1991), A Kind of Living (1988), the Catherine Cookson adaptation The Glass Virgin (1995), and appearing opposite Jimmy Nail in BBC's Spender (1991–1993).

In 1993, Welch became a household name when she was cast as Marsha Stubbs in ITV's drama series Soldier Soldier. Owing to her success in the series, she released a double-A side single in 1995, coupling "You Don't Have to Say You Love Me" (a cover of the Dusty Springfield hit) with "Cry Me a River" (a standard popularised by Julie London), which reached number 23 in the UK Singles Chart.

Welch gained even wider notability in 1997, when she was cast as Natalie Horrocks in the long-running ITV soap opera Coronation Street. Natalie was introduced as a divorcee who soon became the mistress of Kevin Webster (played by Michael Le Vell), the husband of Sally Webster. Kevin and Sally were one of the show's longest-running couples, and had two children. Originally portrayed as a femme fatale, Natalie rose to respectability by becoming landlady of the soap's famous public house, The Rovers Return. In 2000, the Coronation Street producers wanted Welch to perform a storyline involving Natalie having a miscarriage, but she refused, saying that the character had already lost her husband and son. However, Welch, who was expecting a baby the same year, decided to leave the serial. At the time, Welch commented, "I am looking forward to being a mum again and spending some time with my baby and am relishing the prospect of new challenges in my career." A spokesperson for Granada TV commented, "The character [Natalie] will be gone as she moves to somewhere new, we wish Denise well both for the birth of her baby and for her future career."

In 2002, Welch guest-starred in ITV's Where the Heart Is, and the BBC's hospital drama Holby City, playing risk manager Pam McGrath, who conducted an on-screen relationship with the character Mubbs Hussein (played by Ian Aspinall). She guest-starred twice in ITV's long-running police drama The Bill (in 1997 and 2006), and has also appeared in the BBC's Doctors (2004), Down to Earth (2004–2005) and Born and Bred (2002–2003). Welch starred (with second billing) in the British feature film The Jealous God (2005) and Hollyoaks: In the City (2006), amongst other appearances. From 2006 to 2010, she appeared as French teacher Steph Haydock in the successful BBC One school-based drama series Waterloo Road, and played Janet "Goldie" Gold in an episode called "Rogue" of the long-running medical drama series, Casualty, which aired on 2 July 2011.

Welch originally won the role of Frances Myers in Bad Girls, but ended up declining it owing to illness at the time; her future Waterloo Road co-star Eva Pope received the part instead. Welch left Waterloo Road without intending to return for Series six, but eventually decided to come back for episodes nine and ten.

Via the BenidormTweets Twitter feed, it was revealed that Welch would have a part in Series 4 of Benidorm. She played the part of 'Scary' Mary, alongside her then-husband, Tim Healy.

In 2012, Welch played Truvy in the touring production of Steel Magnolias. The following year, she played the part of Catherine Robinson in Richard Bean's Smack Family Robinson at the Rose Theatre in Kingston.

On 25 March 2016, it was announced that Welch would guest star in EastEnders as Alison Slater, the estranged mother of Kyle Slater (Riley Carter Millington) and secret stepmother of Stacey Slater (Lacey Turner). Of her casting, Welch stated: "I'm so thrilled to be part of such an iconic show; it's so exciting! I have several friends on the show and it's a great crowd so I can't wait to get started. It's a short stint but such a powerful role and I'm thrilled to be taking this on." Welch made her initial appearance as Alison on 3 May 2016, with fans praising her performance and insisting she was given a permanent role in the soap.

In 2017, Welch appeared as Valerie in the romantic comedy film Finding Fatimah. Welch starred in Black Eyed Susan, alongside son Louis, a short film which details Welch's own experience with depression. The film won the Best Drama Award at that year's Silicon Beach Film Awards.

In January 2018, it was announced that Welch would play Celia in the UK touring production of Calendar Girls: The Musical.

In May 2020, Welch appeared as Doll Belvedere in the online series Dun Breedin, written by and starring Julie Graham alongside Angela Griffin, Alison Newman, Tracy-Ann Oberman and Tamzin Outhwaite in leading roles. Due to the lockdown imposed because of the COVID-19 pandemic, Welch's scenes were filmed in her own home, and the series also starred her husband, Lincoln Townley, as Doll's husband Zoot.

Presenting and personal appearances
Welch has presented numerous television shows, and also appeared in a series of SCS adverts promoting soft furnishings. She hosted her own DIY series The Real DIY Show in 2000 and Soap Fever for ITV2. In 2001, she appeared on Lily Savage's Blankety Blank. Since 2005, she has been a regular panellist on ITV's topical lunchtime chat show Loose Women. In 1999, she appeared as Petula Clark in ITV's celebrity singing contest Stars in Their Eyes.

She was the subject of This Is Your Life in 1999, when she was surprised by Michael Aspel at Piccadilly Station in Manchester.

In 2008, Welch appeared on a celebrity version of Who Wants to be a Millionaire along with Falklands War hero Simon Weston. In 2009, Welch took over as narrator of the revamped series of 10 Years Younger, for Channel 4. She also participated in Playing the Part, a documentary on BBC One on 21 May 2009, in which she went back to her old secondary school, Consett Community Sports College, and taught there for a week.

Welch shows her support for the children's charity, Children North East which is based in Newcastle, by making appearances at events and supporting community-based projects. In April 2010, Welch appeared with her husband Tim on ITV's All Star Mr & Mrs and donated their runner-up prize of £5,000 to Children North East. She also appears in the biannual benefit concert Sunday for Sammy, recently parodying the show Loose Women as "Slack Lasses".

Welch guest presented the ITV Breakfast programme Lorraine in November 2010. Beginning on 9 January 2011, Welch participated in the sixth series of Dancing on Ice on ITV with her skating partner, American professional ice skater Matt Evers, who partnered Zöe Salmon and Heather Mills in previous series. On the eighth week of the show, which was broadcast on 6 March 2011, she and Evers were the seventh couple to be voted out of the competition after losing the skate-off to army soldier, Johnson Beharry.

In January 2012, Welch was a housemate in Celebrity Big Brother on Channel 5 in the UK. She went on to win the series, beating Frankie Cocozza in the final.

In 2013, she participated in the ITV dancing show Stepping Out with husband Lincoln Townley.

It is believed that Welch "walked out" of Loose Women in October 2013 due to differences with the new director of ITV, Helen Warner. She returned to the show in June 2018.

She appeared on the 2013 Christmas special of Through the Keyhole, hosted by Keith Lemon.

In early September 2020, Welch appeared on This Morning claiming in her interview with Eamonn Holmes and Ruth Langsford that the media and the authorities are "fear-mongering" over the COVID-19 pandemic. She had a disagreement on Twitter with Piers Morgan over COVID-19 infection rates. Morgan called her "deluded" and "dangerous" after her appearance on This Morning.

Personal life
Welch lives in Cheshire. Her first marriage was to actor David Easter, from 1983 until their divorce in 1988; Welch has since gone public with her belief that he committed adultery. Welch met Tim Healy while they were working together for Newcastle's Live Theatre Company. They married in Haringey, London, in 1988 and have two children: Matthew Healy (born 8 April 1989, Hendon, London), who is a member of the alternative rock band The 1975, and Louis Vincent (born 2 March 2001, Salford).

Welch announced, live on Loose Women on 6 February 2012, that she and Healy were separated and that they had been for a long time. Shortly after that, Welch announced that she was dating her PR manager, Lincoln Townley. In August 2012, it was revealed that she and Townley were engaged. On 13 July 2013, they married in Portugal.

Welch confessed that her marriage was nearly ruined because of her mental illness, as well as an affair she had during her depression. With the help of her former Coronation Street co-star Kevin Kennedy, she attended Alcoholics Anonymous and suggests this helped her end her dependency on alcohol. In April 2010, her 320-page autobiography Pulling Myself Together was published, in which she describes how she overcame her problems with alcohol, drugs and depression. It became a best-seller in the UK.

In a February 2015 interview, she said that she felt "freer from my mental health issues in my 50s than I did in my 30s and 40s". In April 2017, Welch announced her backing of Women's Equality Party candidate Tabitha Morton in the Liverpool City Region mayoral election.

Filmography

Theatre credits

Theatre

Bibliography

Memoirs
Pulling Myself Together (Pan, 2010) 
Starting Over (Pan, 2012) 
The Unwelcome Visitor (Hodder and Stoughton, 2020)

Novels
If They Could See Me Now (Sphere, 2016) 
The Mother's Bond (Sphere, 2018)

See also
 List of Celebrity Big Brother (British TV series) housemates
 List of Dancing on Ice contestants

References

External links

1958 births
Living people
Alumni of the Mountview Academy of Theatre Arts
Reality show winners
English soap opera actresses
English television actresses
English television presenters
English autobiographers
People with mood disorders
English women novelists
People educated at Consett Grammar School
Women's Equality Party people
Actors from County Durham
People from Consett
Actresses from Tyne and Wear
People from Ebchester
People from Tynemouth
Women autobiographers